Joe Martin is a jazz bassist and composer.

Biography
Martin moved to New York City in 1994. His recording debut as a leader was Passage, a quartet album with tenor saxophonist Mark Turner, pianist Kevin Hays and drummer Jorge Rossy, recorded in 2001. Seven of the eight tracks were Martin compositions. His second album as leader was Not by Chance, in 2009, with Chris Potter (tenor sax, soprano sax, bass clarinet), Brad Mehldau (piano), and Marcus Gilmore (drums). Martin has often worked in Turner's quartet, and in guitarist Gilad Hekselman's group.

Discography
An asterisk (*) indicated that the year is that of release.

As leader

As sideman

References

Jazz double-bassists
Living people
Year of birth missing (living people)